William de Bosco (also de Boys) was an English medieval churchman, college fellow, and university chancellor.

William de Bosco was one of the early Fellows of Merton College, Oxford, from 1284 to 1286.
He was a doctor of theology and Chancellor of the University of Oxford. Later he became a Canon at Salisbury through Simon of Ghent, Bishop of Salisbury and also a Chancellor of Oxford University.

References

Year of birth unknown
Year of death unknown
English Roman Catholic theologians
13th-century English Roman Catholic priests
Fellows of Merton College, Oxford
Chancellors of the University of Oxford
14th-century English Roman Catholic priests